Antoine Bibeau (born May 1, 1994) is a Canadian professional ice hockey goaltender currently playing with the Belleville Senators in the American Hockey League (AHL) while under contract with the Ottawa Senators of the National Hockey League (NHL). Bibeau was selected by the Toronto Maple Leafs in the sixth round, 172nd overall, of the 2013 NHL Entry Draft.

Playing career

Junior career
As a youth, Bibeau played in the 2006 and 2007 Quebec International Pee-Wee Hockey Tournaments with the Victoriaville Tigres minor ice hockey team. Bibeau played in the Quebec Major Junior Hockey League (QMJHL) from 2011 to 2014. He played with the Charlottetown Islanders until his final year of major junior hockey when he was traded to the Val-d'Or Foreurs. He went on to capture the 2014 President's Cup with the Foreurs and was recognized for his outstanding play when he was awarded the Guy Lafleur Trophy as the QMJHL Playoffs Most Valuable Player. The Foreurs then went on to play in the Memorial Cup where Bibeau was named the tournament's outstanding goaltender.

Professional career
Bibeau was selected in the 6th round, 172nd overall in the 2013 NHL Entry Draft by the Toronto Maple Leafs. He was invited to his first training camp in 2013, but was sent back to his junior team in the first round of cuts. On July 3, 2014, the Maple Leafs signed Bibeau to an entry-level contract. He attended training camp in 2014 and had a successful rookie tournament, but was demoted to the teams' American Hockey League (AHL) affiliate, the Toronto Marlies, on September 29. Bibeau was called up on an emergency basis in February 2015 to replace a Jonathan Bernier who was out with an illness but did not play. Bibeau was recalled on December 1, 2015, when James Reimer was announced as injured. He was reassigned to the Marlies on December 10. The following season he attended the 2016 Maple Leafs training camp and was returned to the Marlies. He was recalled in December 2016 to replace the struggling Jhonas Enroth and made his NHL debut on December 11, in a match up against the Colorado Avalanche. Despite a solid performance by both Bibeau and the team, where they recorded 52 shots to Colorado's 29, the Maple Leafs would lose 3–1. He was demoted again until being recalled on December 27. Bibeau's first NHL win came in his second game, where he would make 25 saves in a 3–2 overtime win against the Tampa Bay Lightning on December 29. He was returned to the Marlies in January 2017. At the completion of his entry-level contract with the Maple Leafs, Bibeau was not tendered a qualifying offer as a restricted free agent on June 26, 2017. Bibeau finished his career with the Leafs with a 1–1–0 record and .927 save percentage. He played in 104 games with the Marlies, finishing with a 56–33–11 record and a save percentage of .906.

On July 1, 2017, Bibeau as a free agent signed a one-year, two-way contract with the San Jose Sharks. After reporting to his first training camp with the Sharks, Bibeau was assigned to AHL affiliate, the San Jose Barracuda, and posted a 23–14–4 record in his first season with the Barracuda in 2017–18. He had a .919 save percentage and a 2.37 goals-against average, earning a spot on the Pacific Division's All-Star Team. On March 13, 2018, Bibeau signed a two-year contract extension with the Sharks. On October 2, 2018, he was assigned by the Sharks to continue with the San Jose Barracuda. He spent the 2018–19 season in the AHL, where he went 16–13–5 with a .904 save percentage and a 2.89 goals-against average.

Prior to the 2019–20 season, Bibeau was traded by the Sharks to the Colorado Avalanche in exchange for Nicolas Meloche on September 27, 2019. He was directly assigned to report to the Colorado Eagles' training camp. In his Eagles debut on October 4, 2019, Bibeau allowed five goals in an opening night defeat to the Stockton Heat, while also suffering a hip injury which placed him on the injured reserve. After a month of rehabilitation, Bibeau was recalled by the Avalanche due to multiple injuries in goal and made his debut with the Avalanche in replacing Adam Werner during a 6-2 defeat to the Edmonton Oilers on November 14, 2019. On November 16, 2019, he became the fourth goaltender to start a game with the Avalanche and also record a win in backstopping Colorado to a 5-4 overtime decision over the Vancouver Canucks. In returning to the AHL, during his first game back with the Eagles on November 23, Bibeau suffered a re-occurrence of his hip injury and opted to undergo season-ending hip surgery effectively ending his brief but eventful stint within the Avalanche organization.

As a free agent on October 22, 2020, Bibeau signed a one-year, two-way contract with the Carolina Hurricanes. Bibeau never featured with the Hurricanes in the shortened  season, posting 5 wins through 8 games in his assignment to the Chicago Wolves of the AHL.

On August 20, 2021, Bibeau signed as a free agent to a one-year, two-way contract with expansion club, the Seattle Kraken. In the following 2021–22 season, Bibeau endured a disjointed season, joining shared AHL affiliate, the Charlotte Checkers, and splitting the season with the Allen Americans of the ECHL.

At the conclusion of his contract with the Kraken, Bibeau left as a free agent and was signed to a one-year, two-way contract with the Ottawa Senators on July 14, 2022.

Career statistics

Awards and honors

References

External links

1994 births
Living people
Allen Americans players
Belleville Senators players
Canadian expatriate ice hockey players in the United States
Canadian ice hockey goaltenders
Charlotte Checkers (2010–) players
Charlottetown Islanders players
Chicago Wolves players
Colorado Avalanche players
Colorado Eagles players
French Quebecers
Ice hockey people from Quebec
Lewiston Maineiacs players
P.E.I. Rocket players
People from Victoriaville
Quebec Amateur Athletic Association players
San Jose Barracuda players
Toronto Maple Leafs draft picks
Toronto Maple Leafs players
Toronto Marlies players
Val-d'Or Foreurs players